Antti Emil Linna (7 October 1916 - 17 January 2000) was a Finnish engineer and politician. He was at first active in the National Progressive Party. He was a member of the Parliament of Finland, representing the People's Party of Finland from 1962 to 1965 and the Liberal People's Party from 1965 to 1966. He was born in Messukylä, the son of Eemil Linna.

References

1916 births
2000 deaths
Politicians from Tampere
People from Häme Province (Grand Duchy of Finland)
National Progressive Party (Finland) politicians
People's Party of Finland (1951) politicians
Liberals (Finland) politicians
Members of the Parliament of Finland (1962–66)
20th-century Finnish engineers